Rothschild is a name derived from the German zum rothen Schild (with the old spelling "th"), meaning "to the red shield", in reference to the houses where these family members lived or had lived. At the time, houses were designated by signs with different symbols or colors, not numbers. The name Rothschild in Yiddish means "red coat" (coat as in heraldic coat of arms). The Rothschild banking family's coat of arms features in the center of its heraldry a red shield. 

The German surname "Rothschild" is not related to the Scottish/Irish surname of "Rothchilds" from the United Kingdom.

People

The most notable family of people with this surname are descendants of Mayer Amschel Rothschild who formed a financial dynasty and, in modern history, perhaps the wealthiest family by the scale of their private fortune.

In Denmark, by royal decree of 29 March 1814, all Danish Jews were obliged to adopt a surname after their town of residence. In the records, one family with residence in Roskilde took the name Rothschild, presumably because of the German pronunciation of the town's name. The wife of writer Meïr Aron Goldschmidt, Lea Rothschild (born 1801), was of that family. There are no indications that the Rothschilds of Roskilde had any relation with the other Rothschild families.

The name is also carried by others, mostly Ashkenazi Jews, who are not related to members of the banking family.

People outside the banking family
 Abram M. Rothschild (1863–1902), American businessman
 Abraham Rothschild (1853–?), American traveling salesman and murderer of Diamond Bessie.
 Alonzo Rothschild (1862–1915) parents unknown, son, John fared well in the travel industry, wrote the book "Honest Abe."
 Amalie Rothschild (1916–2001), American artist
 Bruce Lee Rothschild (b. 1941), American mathematician
Daniel Rothschild (philosopher) (b. 1979), American philosopher
Daniel Rothschild (general) (b. 1946), Israeli major general
 Dorothy Rothschild, better known as Dorothy Parker (1893–1967), American poet and writer
 Eva Rothschild (b. 1972), Irish artist based in London
 Friedrich S. Rothschild (1899–1995), German-Jewish psychiatrist and semiotician
 Geoffrey Rothschild (b. 1947), South African businessman, former Chairman of JSE Limited.
 Jean Maurice Rothschild (1902–1998), French furniture designer
 Jeffrey J. Rothschild (b. 1954), American billionaire entrepreneur and business executive; Vice President of Infrastructure Software for Facebook.
 Jonathan Rothschild (b. 1955), American (Arizona) lawyer and politician, mayor of Tucson
 Joseph Rothschild (1931–2000), American historian
 Larry Rothschild (b. 1954), American Baseball pitcher and manager
Louis F. Rothschild (1869–1957), founder of the defunct L.F. Rothschild merchant and investment banking firm
 Lynn J. Rothschild (b. 1957), American evolutionary biologist and astrobiologist 
 Michael Rothschild (b. 1942), American economist, former dean at Princeton
 Robert Rothschild (1911–1978), Belgian diplomat (descendant of Amschel Moses Rothschild)
 Samuel Rothschild (1899–1987), Canadian ice hockey player
 Simon F. Rothschild (1861–1936), American businessman Chair Abraham & Straus
 Victor Henry Rothschild (1835–1911), American businessman

People of the banking family

A
 Adèle von Rothschild (1843–1922), German socialite, daughter of Mayer Carl von Rothschild and wife of her 2nd cousin Salomon James de Rothschild
 Adelheid von Rothschild (1853–1935), daughter of Wilhelm Carl von Rothschild
 Albert Salomon Anselm von Rothschild (1844–1911), Austrian banker, son of Anselm von Rothschild
 Alfred de Rothschild (1842–1918), English banker, son of Lionel de Rothschild
 Alice Charlotte von Rothschild  (1847–1922), Austrian socialite, daughter of Anselm von Rothschild
 Aline Caroline de Rothschild (1867–1909), French socialite, daughter of Baron Gustave de Rothschild
 Alphonse James de Rothschild  (1827–1905), French businessman and philanthropist, son of James Mayer de Rothschild
 Amschel Mayor James Rothschild (1955–1996), British businessman, son of Victor Rothschild
 Amschel Mayer von Rothschild (1773–1855), German banker, son of Mayer Amschel Rothschild
 Amschel Moses Rothschild (c. 1710–1755), German trader, father of Mayer Amschel Rothschild
 Anselm von Rothschild (1803–1874), Austrian banker, son of Salomon Mayer von Rothschild
 Anthony Gustav de Rothschild (1887–1961), British banker, son of Leopold de Rothschild
 Anthony James de Rothschild (b. 1977), British businessman, son of Evelyn Robert de Rothschild
 Anthony Nathan de Rothschild (1810–1876), British banker, son of Nathan Mayer Rothschild
 Ariane de Rothschild (née Langner 1965), French banker, wife of Benjamin de Rothschild
 Arthur de Rothschild (1851–1903), French socialite, son of Nathaniel and Charlotte de Rothschild

B
 Béatrice Ephrussi de Rothschild (1864–1934), French socialite and art collector, daughter of Alphonse James de Rothschild
 Benjamin de Rothschild (1963–2021), Swiss banker, son of Edmond Adolphe de Rothschild
 Bethsabée de Rothschild (1914–1999),  Jewish philanthropist, daughter of Édouard Alphonse de Rothschild
 Bettina Caroline de Rothschild (1858–1892, French socialite, daughter of Alphonse James de Rothschild, wife of her cousin Albert Salomon von Rothschild
 Betty von Rothschild, Baronne de Rothschild (1805–1886), French socialite, daughter of Salomon Mayer von Rothschild, wife of her uncle James Mayer de Rothschild

C
 Carl Mayer von Rothschild (1788–1855), German banker, son of Mayer Amschel Rothschild
 Cécile de Rothschild (1913–1995), French socialite and friend of Greta Garbo, daughter of Robert Philippe de Rothschild 
 Charles Rothschild (1877–1923), English banker and entomologist, son of Nathan, 1st Baron Rothschild
 Charlotte de Rothschild (1825–1899), French socialite and painter, daughter of James Mayer de Rothschild, wife of her cousin Nathaniel de Rothschild
 Charlotte von Rothschild (1819–1884), British socialite, daughter of Carl Mayer von Rothschild, wife of her first cousin Lionel de Rothschild
 Charlotte Henriette de Rothschild (b. 1955), British singer, daughter of Edmund Leopold de Rothschild
 Charlotte Nathan Rothschild (1807–1859), British socialite, daughter of Nathan Mayer Rothschild, wife of her first cousin Anselm von Rothschild

D
 David Mayer de Rothschild (b. 1978), British adventurer, ecologist, and environmentalist, son of Evelyn Robert de Rothschild 
 David René de Rothschild  (b. 1942), French banker, son of Guy de Rothschild
 Dorothy de Rothschild (née Pinto 1895–1988), English philanthropist, wife of James Armand de Rothschild

E
 Edmond Adolphe de Rothschild (1926–1997), French-Swiss banker
 Edmond James de Rothschild (1845–1934), French banker, son of James Mayer de Rothschild
 Edmund Leopold de Rothschild (1916–2009), British banker, son of Lionel Nathan de Rothschild
 Édouard de Rothschild (b. 1957), French businessman and equestrian, son of Guy de Rothschild
 Edouard Alphonse de Rothschild (1868–1949), French financier, son of Alphonse James de Rothschild
 Élie de Rothschild (1917–2007), French banker, son of Robert Philippe de Rothschild
 Elisabeth de Rothschild (née de Chambure 1902–1945), French vintner, wife of Philippe de Rothschild
 Emma Georgina Rothschild (b. 1948), British historian and professor, daughter of Victor Rothschild
 Evelina de Rothschild (1839–1866), English socialite, daughter of Lionel de Rothschild, wife of her 2nd cousin Ferdinand James von Rothschild
 Evelyn Achille de Rothschild (1886–1917), British banker, son of Leopold de Rothschild
 Evelyn Robert de Rothschild (1931-2022), British financier, son of Anthony Gustav de Rothschild

F
 Ferdinand James von Rothschild (1839–1898), British politician and art collector, son of Anselm von Rothschild

G
Guy de Rothschild (1909–2007), French banker, son of Édouard Alphonse de Rothschild

H
 Hannah Mary Rothschild (b. 1962), British writer, businesswoman, philanthropist and documentary filmmaker. Daughter of Jacob Rothschild, 4th Baron Rothschild
 Hannah de Rothschild, Countess of Rosebery (1851–1890), British philanthropist, daughter of Mayer Amschel de Rothschild
 Hélène de Rothschild, better known as Hélène van Zuylen (1863–1947), French socialite and author, daughter of Salomon James de Rothschild

J
 Jacob Rothschild, 4th Baron Rothschild (b. 1936), British banker, son of Victor Rothschild
 Jacqueline de Rothschild (1911–2012), French-born American chess and tennis player, daughter of Édouard Alphonse de Rothschild
 James Armand de Rothschild (1878–1957), British politician and philanthropist, son of son of Edmond James de Rothschild
 James Mayer de Rothschild (born Jakob Rothschild 1792–1868), German-French banker, son of Mayer Amschel Rothschild
 Jeanne de Rothschild, née Stuart (1908–2003), British actress, wife of Baron Eugène Daniel von Rothschild

L
 Leonora de Rothschild (1837–1911), British socialite, daughter of Lionel de Rothschild, wife of Alphonse James de Rothschild
 Leopold de Rothschild (1845–1917), British banker and horse breeder, son of Lionel de Rothschild
 Leopold David de Rothschild (1927–2012), British financier and musician, son of Lionel Nathan de Rothschild
 Lionel de Rothschild (1808–1879), British banker and politician, son of Nathan Mayer Rothschild
 Lionel Nathan de Rothschild (1882–1942), British banker and politician, son of Leopold de Rothschild
 Louis Nathaniel de Rothschild (1882–1955), Austrian baron, son of Albert Salomon von Rothschild
 Lynn Forester de Rothschild  (née Forester, b. 1954), American businesswoman, wife of Evelyn Robert de Rothschild

M
 Marie-Hélène de Rothschild (1927–1996), French socialite, granddaughter of Hélène de Rothschild and wife of Guy de Rothschild
 Mathilde Hannah von Rothschild (1832–1924), German baroness and composer, daughter of Anselm von Rothschild, wife of her 2nd cousin Wilhelm Carl von Rothschild
 Mayer Amschel Rothschild (1744–1812), German banker and founder of the Rothschild banking dynasty
 Mayer Amschel de Rothschild (1818–1874), British politician, son of Nathan Mayer Rothschild
 Miriam Rothschild (1908–2005), British naturalist and author, daughter of Charles Rothschild

N
 Nadine de Rothschild (née Lhopitalier 1932), French author and actress, wife of Edmond Adolphe de Rothschild 
 Nathan Mayer Rothschild (1777–1836), Jewish banker, son of Mayer Amschel Rothschild
 Nathan Mayer Rothschild, 1st Baron Rothschild(1840–1915), British banker and politician, son of Lionel de Rothschild
 Nathaniel de Rothschild (1812–1870), French banker, businessman, and wine maker, son of Nathan Mayer Rothschild
 Nathaniel Anselm von Rothschild (1836–1905), Austrian socialite, son of Anselm von Rothschild
 Nathaniel Philip Rothschild (b. 1971), a British financier, son of Jacob, 4th Baron Rothschild
 Pannonica "Nica" Rothschild (1913–1988), jazz patroness and writer, daughter of Charles Rothschild

P
 Pauline de Rothschild (née Potter, 1908–1976), French writer and fashion designer, wife of Philippe de Rothschild
 Philippe de Rothschild (1902–1988), French race car driver, screenwriter, producer, and wine grower, son of Henri de Rothschild
 Philippine de Rothschild (1933–2014), French actress and wine grower, daughter of Philippe de Rothschild

S
 Salomon James de Rothschild (1835–1864), son of James Mayer de Rothschild
 Salomon Mayer von Rothschild (1774–1855), German banker, son of Mayer Amschel Rothschild
 Serena Dunn Rothschild  (née Dunn, 1935-2019), wife of Jacob, 4th Baron Rothschild

V
 Victor Rothschild, 3rd Baron Rothschild (1910–1990), a British biologist and cricketer, son of Charles Rothschild

W
 Walter Rothschild, 2nd Baron Rothschild (1868–1937), British banker, politician, and zoologist, son of Nathan, 1st Baron Rothschild
 Wilhelm Carl von Rothschild (1828–1901), German banker, son of Carl Mayer von Rothschild

Fictional characters
Winston Rothschild, III (fictional character from The Red Green Show)

References

Bibliography
Hanks, Patrick Dictionary of American Family Names Oxford University Press 

!
Jewish surnames
Yiddish-language surnames

ru:Ротшильды